The Institute of Plant Industry, Vavilov Institute of Plant Industry or All-Russian Research Institute of Plant Industry (in ), as it is officially called, is a research institute of plant genetics, located in Saint Petersburg, Russia.

History
The Institute of Plant Industry was established in 1921. Nikolai Vavilov was the head of this institute from 1924 to 1936 which had, and still has, the world's largest collection of plant seeds.  During the early 1930s, he became the target of the Lysenkoist debate and was exiled.  The institute's seedbank survived the 28-month siege of Leningrad in World War II, where several botanists starved to death rather than eat the collected seeds. In 2010 the plant collection at the Pavlovsk Experimental Station was to be destroyed to make way for luxury housing. This was averted by order of President Dmitri Medvedev.

The story of the institute during the siege of Leningrad was dramatized in Jessica Oreck's 2019 feature film One Man Dies a Million Times.

Siege of Leningrad
The institute's extensive seed collection was an important target during the siege of Leningrad, Soviet officials took the time to evacuate the art from the city but neglected, or forgot to remove the world's largest seed collection. The scientists of the institute protected the seeds from the threats of the cold, the hungry residents of the besieged city, rats, and their own hunger. Twenty-eight of the botanists died during the siege, protecting their collection.

See also
 Plant genetics
 Lysenkoism
 VASKhNIL (the All-Union Academy of Agricultural Sciences of the Soviet Union)
 Pavlovsk Experimental Station

References

External links
 Official site
 Genetic Resources of Leguminous Plants in the N.I. Vavilov Institute of Plant Industry

Research institutes in Russia
Research institutes in the Soviet Union
Science and technology in Russia
Russian Academy of Agriculture Sciences
VASKhNIL
Botanical research institutes